Lodderena nana is a species of minute sea snail or micromollusc, a marine gastropod mollusc in the family Skeneidae.

Description
The height of the shell attains 0.46 mm, its diameter 0.72 mm.

Subspecies
 Lodderena nana nana Powell, 1930
 Lodderena nana pooki Fleming, 1948

Distribution
This marine species is endemic to New Zealand.

References

 Powell A.W.B. (1930) New species of New Zealand Mollusca from shallow-water dredgings. Part 2. Transactions and Proceedings of the Royal Society of New Zealand 61: 536-546. page(s): 541
 Powell A. W. B., New Zealand Mollusca, William Collins Publishers Ltd, Auckland, New Zealand 1979 

nana
Gastropods of New Zealand
Gastropods described in 1930